Lutibacter litoralis is a rod-shaped bacterium from the genus of Lutibacter which has been isolated from a tidal flat from Ganghwa in Korea.

References

Flavobacteria
Bacteria described in 2006